Clarence Wesley "Cap" Wigington (1883-1967) was an American architect who grew up in Omaha, Nebraska.  After winning three first prizes in charcoal, pencil, and pen and ink at an art competition during the Trans-Mississippi Exposition in 1899, Wigington went on to become a renowned architect across the Midwestern United States, at a time when African-American architects were few. Wigington was the nation's first black municipal architect, serving 34 years as senior designer for the City of Saint Paul, Minnesota's architectural office when the city had an ambitious building program.  Sixty of his buildings still stand in St. Paul, with several recognized on the National Register of Historic Places.  Wigington's architectural legacy is one of the most significant bodies of work by an African-American architect.

Biography

Clarence Wesley Wigington was born in Lawrence, Kansas, in 1883, but his family soon moved to Omaha, where he was raised in North Omaha's Walnut Hill neighborhood. After graduating from Omaha High School at the age of 15, Wigington left an Omaha art school in 1902 to work for Thomas R. Kimball, then president of the American Institute of Architects. After six years he started his own office. In 1910 Wigington was listed by the U.S. Census as one of only 59 African-American architects, artists and draftsmen in the country.  While in Omaha, Wigington designed the Broomfield Rowhouse, Zion Baptist Church, and the second St. John's African Methodist Episcopal Church building, along with several other single and multiple family dwellings.

After marrying Viola Williams, Wigington received his first public commission, to design a small brick potato chip factory in Sheridan, Wyoming.  He ran the establishment for several years.

It was in Saint Paul, Minnesota where Wigington created a national reputation. He moved there in 1914 and by 1917 was promoted to the position of senior architectural designer for the City of St. Paul. During the 1920s and '30s, Wigington designed most of the Saint Paul Public Schools buildings, as well as golf clubhouses, fire stations, park buildings, airports for the city.  Other Wigington structures include the Highland Park Tower, the Holman Field Administration Building and the Harriet Island Pavilion, all now listed on the National Register of Historic Places, as well as the Roy Wilkins Auditorium.  Wigington also designed monumental ice palaces for the St. Paul Winter Carnival in the 1930s and '40s.

Wigington was among the 13 founders of the Sterling Club, a social club for railroad porters, bellboys, waiters, drivers and other black men. He founded the  Home Guards of Minnesota, an all-black militia established in 1918 when racial segregation prohibited his entry into the Minnesota National Guard during World War I. As the leader of that group, he was given the rank of  captain, from which the nickname "Cap" was derived.

After retiring from the City of St. Paul in 1949, Wigington began a private architectural practice in California.  Soon after moving to Kansas City, Missouri in 1967, he died on July 7.

Notable designs
As senior architect for the city, Wigington designed schools, fire stations, park structures and municipal buildings.  Aside from his work in Omaha, Wigington also designed the building which originally hosted the North Carolina State University at Durham.

Nearly 60 Wigington-designed buildings still stand in St. Paul.  They include the notable Highland Park Clubhouse, Cleveland High School, Randolph Heights Elementary School, and the downtown St. Paul Police Station, in addition to the Palm House and the Zoological Building at the Como Park Zoo.

Legacy
Sixty of his buildings still stand in Saint Paul, with four recognized by listing on the National Register of Historic Places.  His architectural legacy constitutes one of the most significant bodies of work by an African-American architect.

Renamed to honor Wigington in 1998, the Harriet Island Pavilion is now called the Clarence W. Wigington Pavilion.

See also
 Architecture of North Omaha, Nebraska

References

Olson, Bob, A Water Tower, A Pavilion And Three National Historic Sites - Clarence Wigington And The Historical Legacy He Left To The People Of St Paul, Ramsey County History Quarterly V34 #4, Ramsey County Historical Society,St Paul, MN, 2000.

External links 
  Clarence Wigington in MNopedia, the Minnesota Encyclopedia 
  Wigington Pemberton Family papers, N194, Northwest Architectural Archives, University of Minnesota Libraries, Minneapolis, MN.
 Cap Wigington, St. Paul's architect, interview of Dr. Annette Atkins on Minnesota Public Radio
 A Biography of "Cap" Clarence Wigington by Linda Williams for NorthOmahaHistory.com

1883 births
1967 deaths
African-American architects
20th-century American architects
African-American history of Minnesota
African-American life in Omaha, Nebraska
Architects from Nebraska
People from Lawrence, Kansas
Artists from Omaha, Nebraska
People from Omaha, Nebraska
Architects from Saint Paul, Minnesota
African-American history of Nebraska
Omaha Central High School alumni
20th-century African-American artists